Beijingdong (Beijing East) railway station is a railway station located near Sihui, in Chaoyang District, Beijing. Line 28 of the Beijing Subway is planned to have a station here.

Schedules 

A scheduled double-decker passenger train between Chengde and Handan (Y512/513, Y514/511) stops at the station every day.

References

Railway stations in China opened in 1938
Railway stations in Chaoyang District, Beijing